Sankval railway station (station code: SKVL) is a main railway station in South Goa district, Goa. It serves Sankval village. The station consists of one platform. The platform is not well sheltered. It lacks many facilities including water and sanitation.

Major trains
 Vasco-da-Gama–Kulem Passenger

References

Hubli railway division
Railway stations in South Goa district